Kirkbride is a civil parish in the Borough of Allerdale in Cumbria, England.  It contains seven  listed buildings that are recorded in the National Heritage List for England.  Of these, two are listed at Grade II*, the middle of the three grades, and the others are at Grade II, the lowest grade.  The parish contains the village of Kirkbride, and is otherwise rural.  The listed buildings consist of a Norman church, houses, farmhouses, farm buildings, and a war memorial.


Key

Buildings

References

Citations

Sources

Lists of listed buildings in Cumbria